The 2014 Delhi Dynamos FC season was the first ever season in the history of the Delhi Dynamos, a franchise in the inaugural season of the Indian Super League. For the first season the Dynamos announced a partnership with Feyenoord, who helped the Indian club assemble their technical staff and squad. 

The Delhi Dynamos began their season on 14 October with a 0–0 draw at home against Pune City. Despite only losing four of their fourteen matches during the 2014 season, the Delhi Dynamos failed to qualify for the finals by only a single point.

Background

Signings

Indian draft

International draft

Other signings

Pre-season

Indian Super League

Table

Results summary

Player statistics

See also
 2014–15 in Indian football

References

Odisha FC seasons
Delhi Dynamos